Bonnevie is a surname. Notable people with the surname include:

Andreas Bonnevie (1782–1833), Norwegian priest and politician
Carl Bonnevie (1881–1972), Norwegian jurist and peace activist
Carl Siegfried Bonnevie (1804–1856), Norwegian naval officer
Dina Bonnevie (born 1961), Filipino-Swiss actress
Honoratus Bonnevie (1726–1811), Norwegian physician
Honoratus Bonnevie (politician) (1797–1848), Norwegian politician
Lou Bonnevie (born 1965), Filipino musician
Margarete Bonnevie (1884–1970), Norwegian author, feminist and politician
Maria Bonnevie (born 1973), Swedish-Norwegian actress